Senator Jewell may refer to:

Jerry Jewell (politician) (1930–2002), Arkansas State Senate
William S. Jewell (1867–1956), Illinois State Senate